Zavkhanmandal is a sum of Zavkhan Province in western Mongolia. The sum centre is 12 km south of Khar Lake. In 2005, its population was 1,324.

References 

Districts of Zavkhan Province